The 1900 United States presidential election in Ohio was held on November 6, 1900 as part of the 1900 United States presidential election. State voters chose 23 electors to the Electoral College, who voted for president and vice president. 

Ohio was won by the Republican Party candidate, incumbent President and Ohio native son William McKinley with 52.30% of the popular vote. The Democratic Party candidate, William Jennings Bryan, garnered 45.66% of the popular vote.

Results

Results by county

See also
 United States presidential elections in Ohio

References

Ohio
1900
1900 Ohio elections